Fernand Dineur (Anderlecht, Belgium, May 17, 1904– April 1956) was a Belgian cartoonist, famous for creating "Tif et Tondu". The series was published in Spirou from the very first issue, 1938.

References

1904 births
1956 deaths
Belgian cartoonists
Belgian comics artists
Belgian humorists